The Lola T97/00 is an open-wheel racing car chassis, designed and built by Lola Cars that competed in the CART open-wheel racing series, for competition in the 1997 IndyCar season. It was not very unsuccessful, with Lola scoring no wins or pole positions that season. It was mainly powered by the  Ford/Cosworth XD turbo engine, but also used the Honda turbo Indy V8 engine.

References 

Open wheel racing cars
American Championship racing cars
Lola racing cars